The year 1959 in architecture involved some significant architectural events and new buildings.

Events
 Boardman Hall at Cornell University, designed by William Henry Miller and built in 1892, is demolished

Buildings and structures

Buildings opened

 May 3 – Birmingham Museum of Art (new building), Birmingham, Alabama, by Warren, Knight & Davis.
 October 21 – Solomon R. Guggenheim Museum, designed by Frank Lloyd Wright.

Buildings completed

 Basilica of Candelaria, Tenerife, Canary Islands, designed by architect José Enrique Marrero Regalado.
 Case Study House #21: Bailey House and #22: Stahl House, by architect Pierre Koenig.
 Zigzag House, Sarasota, Florida, designed by architect Tollyn Twitchell.
 6 Bacon's Lane, Highgate, London, designed by architect Leonard Manasseh for himself.
 Chase Tower, Detroit, Michigan, designed by Albert Kahn Associates.
 Kariba Dam completed between Zambia and Zimbabwe on the Zambezi River.
 The Sidney Myer Music Bowl, Melbourne, Australia.
 Ten Great Buildings project completed in Beijing, China.
 Bracken House, the Financial Times headquarters in the City of London, designed by Sir Albert Richardson.
 Lincoln Motors showrooms and garage, Brayford Pool, Lincoln, England, designed by Sam Scorer of Denis Clarke Hall, Scorer and Bright; engineer Dr K. Hajnal-Kónyi.
 Pride Cleaners, Chicago, designed by Gerald Siegwart.
 National Museum of Western Art, Tokyo, designed by Le Corbusier.
 Finmere Church of England Primary School, England, designed by Mary and David Medd.

Awards
 AIA Gold Medal – Walter Gropius.
 RIBA Royal Gold Medal – Ludwig Mies van der Rohe.

Births

 October 10 – Maya Lin, American designer and artist
 October 10 – Michael Maltzan, American architect
 Jacques Ferrier, French architect
 Lorcan O'Herlihy, Irish-born architect working in the United States

Deaths
 February 23 – Gordon Wilson, Australian-born New Zealand government architect (born 1900)
 April 9 – Frank Lloyd Wright, American architect (born 1867)

References